Fehmi Koru (born 24 July 1950, in İzmir) is a Turkish journalist and columnist.

Background
Koru studied theology in Institute of High Islamic Studies, Izmir/Turkey (1973), and received his master's degree from the Center for Middle Eastern Studies of Harvard University (1982), in between he spent 15 months in London (1977–1978) to study English and a year in Damascus/Syria to improve his Arabic, at Dar-es Selam Arabic Language Center (1979).

He also worked as a research affiliate at the Center for International Studies of Massachusetts Institute of Technology (1980–1982).

Career

Served as a consultant in the State Planning Organisation (1985–1986).

He was the editor of the daily Milli Gazete (1984) and worked at daily Zaman from its inception (1986), first as the editor in chief (1986–1987) then as the chief editorial writer as well as Ankara Bureau Chief (1995–1998). He wrote for ‘Turkish Daily News’ (1999–2000), and ‘The New Anatolian’ (2006); both are English language dailies.

He then joined in daily Yeni Şafak as Ankara Bureau Chief (1999) and was also its chief columnist until 2010. He later joined daily Star (2011–2014).

He was a columnist in daily Haberturk (2014–2016).

Currently, he is a freelance writer and blogger. He continues writing in his personal webpage.

He was a regular commentator on Turkish TV Kanal-7 (1995–2015).

He has appeared regularly on various TV political programs:

He was the recipient of several prestigious press awards including one from Turkish Journalists Association (2003) and another from Progressive Journalists Association of Turkey (2003).

He participated in many scholarly symposia and meetings in and out of Turkey, attended to Bilderberg Conference of 2006.

Books
His journalistic work has been published in seven books in Turkish and one in English. 
 Ben Böyle Gördüm: Cemaat'in Siyasetle Sınavı (Thus I Have Seen: Test Case for Gülen Group in Politics)
 Mekke'de Ne Oldu? (What Happened in Mecca)
 Taha Kıvanç'ın Not Defteri (Diary of Taha Kivanc)
 Terör ve Güneydoğu Sorunu (Terror and the Kurdish Problem) 
 Yeni Dünya Düzeni (New World Order)
 Tabana Kuvvet (On the Road)
 11 Eylül: O Kader Sabahı (9/11: That Fateful Morning)
 One Column Ahead 
His article ‘Democracy and Islam: The Turkish Experiment’ came out in Sept/Oct 1996 issue of ‘Muslim Politics Report’ of the Council on Foreign Relations.

Personal life 
He is married with Dr. Nebahat Koru and has five children.

His brother Naci Koru is currently Deputy Foreign Minister, and he previously served as Turkey's Ambassador in Riyadh, Saudi Arabia. He will takeover his position as permanent representative of Turkey in United Nations Office in Geneve.

While he was in London he shared a flat with Abdullah Gül, who later on became Prime Minister and then President of Republic of Turkey.

Notes 
  Koru has used several aliases, Taha Kıvanç is the most known of all.

References 

1950 births
Living people
People from İzmir
Turkish journalists
Imam Hatip school alumni
Harvard University alumni
Yeni Şafak people